The 2005 IBF World Championships (World Badminton Championships) took place in Arrowhead Pond in Anaheim, United States, between August 15 and August 21, 2005. Following the results in the men's singles.

Seeds

 Lin Dan, Runner-up
 Kenneth Jonassen, Quarter-final
 Peter Gade, Semi-final
 Bao Chunlai, Quarter-final
 Lee Chong Wei, Semi-final
 Taufik Hidayat, Champion
 Chen Hong, Quarter-final
 Muhammad Hafiz Hashim, Third round
 Ng Wei, Third round
 Wong Choong Hann, Third round
 Boonsak Ponsana, Third round
 Niels Christian Kaldau, Second round
 Lee Hyun-il, Quarter-final
 Dicky Palyama, First round
n/a
 Björn Joppien, Third round

Main stage

Section 1

Section 2

Section 3

Section 4

Final stage

External links 
2005 IBF results

- Mens Singles, 2005 Ibf World Championships